The 56th Pennsylvania House of Representatives District is located in southwest Pennsylvania and has been represented by George Dunbar since 2011.

District profile
The 56th District is located in Westmoreland County and includes the following areas:

 Irwin
Jeannette
 Manor
 North Huntingdon Township (part)
Ward 01 
Ward 02 
Ward 04 (part)
Division 01 
Division 03 
Division 04 
Ward 05 
Ward 06 
Ward 07
 North Irwin
Penn
 Penn Township
 Trafford (Westmoreland County Portion)

Representatives

Recent election results

References

External links
District map from the United States Census Bureau
Pennsylvania House Legislative District Maps from the Pennsylvania Redistricting Commission.  

Government of Westmoreland County, Pennsylvania
56